The 1828 State of the Union Address was written by John Quincy Adams, on Tuesday, December 2, 1828.  It was read to both houses of the 20th United States Congress by a clerk on that day.  He said, "If the enjoyment in profusion of the bounties of Providence forms a suitable subject of mutual gratulation and grateful acknowledgment, we are admonished at this return of the season when the representatives of the nation are assembled to deliberate upon their concerns to offer up the tribute of fervent and grateful hearts for the never failing mercies of Him who ruleth over all."

References

State of the Union addresses
Presidency of John Quincy Adams
Works by John Quincy Adams
State of the Union Address
State of the Union Address
State of the Union Address
State of the Union Address
20th United States Congress
December 1828 events
State of the Union